In mathematics, simple homotopy theory is a homotopy theory (a branch of algebraic topology) that concerns with the simple-homotopy type of a space. It was originated by Whitehead in his 1950 paper "Simple homotopy type".

See also 
Whitehead torsion

References

Further reading 

A lecture by J. Lurie.

Homotopy theory
Equivalence (mathematics)